In linear algebra, the outer product of two coordinate vectors is a matrix. If the two vectors have dimensions n and m, then their outer product is an n × m matrix. More generally, given two tensors (multidimensional arrays of numbers), their outer product is a tensor. The outer product of tensors is also referred to as their tensor product, and can be used to define the tensor algebra.

The outer product contrasts with:
 The dot product (a special case of "inner product"), which takes a pair of coordinate vectors as input and produces a scalar
 The Kronecker product, which takes a pair of matrices as input and produces a block matrix
 Standard matrix multiplication

Definition

Given two vectors of size  and  respectively

Or in index notation:

Denoting the dot product by  if given an  vector  then  If given a  vector  then  

For instance, if  and  then

For complex vectors, it is often useful to take the conjugate transpose of  denoted  or :

Contrast with Euclidean inner product
If  then one can take the matrix product the other way, yielding a scalar (or  matrix):

which is the standard inner product for Euclidean vector spaces, better known as the dot product. The dot product is the trace of the outer product. Unlike the dot product, the outer product is not commutative.

Multiplication of a vector  by the matrix  can be written in terms of the inner product, using the relation .

The outer product of tensors

Connection with the Kronecker product
The outer product and Kronecker product are closely related; in fact the same symbol is commonly used to denote both operations.

In the case of column vectors, the Kronecker product can be viewed as a form of vectorization (or flattening) of the outer product.

Note that the order of the vectors is reversed in the right side of the equation.

Another similar identity that further highlights the similarity between the operations is

where the order of vectors needs not be flipped. The middle expression uses matrix multiplication, where the vectors are considered as column/row matrices.

Connection with the matrix product 

Then  can be expressed as a sum of column-by-row outer products:

Note the duality of this expression with the more common one as a matrix built with row-by-column inner product entries (or dot product): 

This relation is relevant in the application of the Singular Value Decomposition (SVD) (and Spectral Decomposition as a special case).  In particular, the decomposition can be interpreted as the sum of outer products of each left and right singular vectors, scaled by the corresponding nonzero singular value :

This result implies that  can be expressed as a sum of rank-1 matrices with spectral norm  in decreasing order. This explains the fact why, in general, the last terms contribute less, which motivates the use of the Truncated SVD as an approximation.  The first term is the least squares fit of a matrix to an outer product of vectors.

Properties
The outer product of vectors satisfies the following properties:

The outer product of tensors satisfies the additional associativity property:

Rank of an outer product
If u and v are both nonzero, then the outer product matrix uvT always has matrix rank 1. Indeed, the columns of the outer product are all proportional to the first column. Thus they are all linearly dependent on that one column, hence the matrix is of rank one.

("Matrix rank" should not be confused with "tensor order", or "tensor degree", which is sometimes referred to as "rank".)

Definition (abstract)
Let  and  be two vector spaces.

If  is an inner product space, then it is possible to define the outer product as a linear map . The outer product  is then given by

In programming languages

In some programming languages, given a two-argument function f (or a binary operator), the outer product of f and two one-dimensional arrays A and B is a two-dimensional array C such that C[i, j] = f(A[i], B[j]). This is syntactically represented in various ways: in APL, as the infix binary operator ∘.f; in J, as the postfix adverb f/; in R, as the function outer(A, B, f) or the special %o%; in Mathematica, as Outer[f, A, B]. In MATLAB, the function kron(A, B) is used for this product. These often generalize to multi-dimensional arguments, and more than two arguments.

In the Python library NumPy, the outer product can be computed with function np.outer(). In contrast, np.kron results in a flat array. The outer product of multidimensional arrays can be computed using np.multiply.outer.

Applications
As the outer product is closely related to the Kronecker product, some of the applications of the Kronecker product use outer products. These applications are found in quantum theory, signal processing, and image compression.

Spinors

The determinant of this matrix is  because of the commutative property of C.

In the theory of spinors in three dimensions, these matrices are associated with isotropic vectors due to this null property. Élie Cartan described this construction in 1937, but it was introduced by Wolfgang Pauli in 1927 so that M(2, C) has come to be called Pauli algebra.

Concepts
The block form of outer products is useful in classification. Concept analysis is a study that depends on certain outer products:

When a vector has only zeros and ones as entries, it is called a logical vector, a special case of a logical matrix. The logical operation and takes the place of multiplication. This type of matrix is used in the study of binary relations, and is called a rectangular relation or a cross-vector.

See also
 Dyadics
 Householder transformation
 Norm (mathematics)
 Scatter matrix
 Ricci calculus

Products
 Cartesian product
 Cross product
 Exterior product
 Hadamard product

Duality
 Complex conjugate
 Conjugate transpose
 Transpose
 Bra–ket notation for outer product

References

Further reading

Bilinear maps
Operations on vectors
Higher-order functions
Articles with example Python (programming language) code